Nûredin Zaza (born 15 February 1919 – 7 October 1988) was a Kurdish politician, writer and poet. He was a co-founder of the Kurdistan Democratic Party of Syria and a founding member of the Kurdish Institute of Paris.

Biography
Born in 1919 to a middle-class family in Maden, Elazığ in the years preceding the fall of the dissolution of the Ottoman Empire, he saw his father and brother get arrested by the Atatürk regime for having supported the Sheikh Said rebellion and the Ararat rebellion. In 1930, he was sent into exile to Syria together with his brother Ahmed Nafez Zaza. There, the brothers found support from the Bedir Khan family.

After spending a year in jail in British Iraq, he went to Beirut and later Switzerland for his studies. In Switzerland, he also founded an association for Kurdish students in Europe before returning to Syria. In Syria, he prepared a party program together with Osman Sabri, took part in establishing Kurdistan Democratic Party of Syria (KDPS) in 1957 and was its president by 1958. He also wrote for the magazine Hawar of the Bedir Khan brothers and contributed to the modernization of the Kurdish language. Zaza was also a member of Xoybûn and broadcast a radio program with Kamuran Alî Bedirxan during this period. In September 1962, he got briefly arrested by Syrian authorities, accusing him of supporting the Kurdish uprising in neighboring Iraq. After being jailed again in 1965 and the intensified Turkish threats, Zaza fled to Switzerland in July 1970 – the same country he had studied in.

Zaza wrote his dissertation on Emmanuel Mounier in 1955 in at the Lausanne University. Zaza's brother Suphi Ergene was a parliamentarian in the Turkish Parliament representing Elazığ district for the Democrat Party from 1954 to 1957.

Selected literature

References

Further reading

1919 births
1988 deaths
Kurdish nationalists
Kurdish politicians
Kurdish writers
People from Elazığ Province
University of Lausanne alumni
Turkish emigrants to Switzerland
Turkish expatriates in Syria
Turkish expatriates in Lebanon
Turkish expatriates in Iraq